Rapho  may refer to:
 Rapho (agency), a French photo agency
Rapho Township, Lancaster County, Pennsylvania